Thabo Gabriel Malema (born 26 December 1985), is a South African actor. He is best known for the roles in the films and television serials: The No. 1 Ladies' Detective Agency, Single Guys and Strike Back.

Personal life
He was born on 26 December 1985 in Mabopane, Gauteng, Johannesburg. He completed education from Maryvale college. Then he studied film at South African School of Motion Picture Medium and Live Performance (AFDA). He also followed a communication and language degree at UNISA. In 2010, he travelled to Uganda and Niger and worked on the Airtel mobile company.

Career
He started acting career in 2006 without prior acting background. He then produced the historical film, Kalushi. The film revolves around the story of a young boy, Solomon Mahlangu, who joins the South African Liberation movement after being beaten by apartheid police officers. In theater, he played in the stage plays such as All Balls, Umuzi ka Vusi and Woza Albert. In 2015, he nominated for the Golden Horn Award of Best Actor in a lead role at South African Film and Television Awards (SAFTAs) for his role as Khaya in the film Single Guys. However, he is best known for appearing on Agent as Vuyo and on Ashes to Ashes as Young Selogilwe Namane.

Apart from cinema and theater, he also appeared in Television productions such as The Lab and Room 9, Single Guys, Gold Diggers and Lithapo. Meanwhile, he collaborated with international Hollywood movies such as Primeval Kill, 10 000 BC and A Million Colors.

In August 2020, he starred in the sex comedy film Seriously Single co-directed by Katleho Ramaphakela and Rethabile Ramaphakela. It was released on July 31, 2020 on Netflix.

Television serials
 Lithapo - season 1 
 Gold Diggers - season 1 and 2 
 The Lab – season 2 
 Strike Back – season 2 
 The No. 1 Ladies' Detective Agency – season 1 
 The Professionals Single Guys – season 1 
 The River - season 1 and 2 
 Room 9 - season 1 
 Easy Money – season 1 
 Jacob's Cross – season 5 
 Gauteng Maboneng - s

Filmography

References

External links
 

Living people
South African male film actors
South African male television actors
1985 births
People from Gauteng